Cuiping Subdistrict is a subdistrict in Qixia, Shandong, China. , it administers the following 58 villages: 
Chengguan Village
Chengdonggou Village
Dawuzikuang Village
Xiaowuzikuang Village
Wanjiagou Village
Nandingjiagou Village
Nansanlidian Village
Nan'erlidian Village
Zaoxing Village
Linjiating Village
Xiaodonggou Village
Xi'erlidian Village
Xisanlidian Village
Nanlinjiazhuang Village
Shijiazhuang Village
Wulihou Village
Nansongjiagou Village
Nanqilizhuang Village
Shilizhuang Village
Muxianzhuang Village
Yulinzhuang Village
Wawu Village
Guoluozhuang Village
Daxiazhi Village
Xiaoxiazhi Village
Xiaoliukou Village
Daliukou Village
Dianxigou Village
Dongnandian Village
Nanshicha Village
Laolongwan Village
Yejiabu Village
Dalingshan Village
Xiaolingshan Village
Beikuang Village
Shangqujia Village
Shangliujia Village
Luojiazhuang Village
Lilin Village
Heidoupeng Village
Shijia Village
Houzhangjiazhuang Village
Huangyandi Village
Moujiazhuang Village
Shihezi Village
Shangsunjia Village
Yijiapozi Village
Liujiahe Village
Huangjiazhuang Village
Qiliqiao Village
Houyangwo Village
Qianyangwo Village
Xiaohebei Village
Dahebei Village
Fuzeng Village
Dongfuyuan Village
Xifuyuan Village
Nanfuyuan Village

See also 
 List of township-level divisions of Shandong

References 

Township-level divisions of Shandong
Qixia, Shandong